Bethania de la Cruz de Peña (born May 13, 1987) is a volleyball player from the Dominican Republic, who won the gold medal with the Dominican women's national team at the 2009 NORCECA Championship and the 2010 Pan-American Cup.

Career

2006
De la Cruz won the Most Valuable Player award when she helped her Dominican professional club Mirador to win the Championship. Playing with her Junior National Team at the 2006 U-20 NORCECA Women's Junior Continental Championship, she won the Most Valuable Player and Best Scorer awards. Her team won the silver medal. She became the MVP of the 2006 TV Azteca's Women Stars Volleyball Cup, played in Monterrey, Mexico won by the team with a perfect record in 5 matches. Previously, she won the bronze medal in beach volleyball at the 2006 National Championship, playing with Karla Echenique. After that season she became "Dominican Republic Volleyball Player of the Year".

2007
At the 2007 Pan-American Cup she took the bronze medal with her National Team and also the Best Scorer award. She took the same award later at the 2007 NORCECA Championship.

She played with the Puero Rican professional team Vaqueras de Bayamón for the 2007 season, being awarded as MVP of the All-Star Game, and the "Best Spiker" of the season.

2008
For the 2007/2008 season of the Japanese V.Premier League she played with the Toray Arrows, finishing as league champion and "Best 6". At the end of the season she won for the second time the "2008 Dominican Republic Volleyball Player of the Year".

With her National Team, she won the Silver Medal and the "Best Attacker" and "Best Scorer" at the 2008 Final Four Cup. Same year was awarded "Best Attacker" at the 2008 edition of the Salonpas Cup.

The next season, 2008/2009, she played for the South Korean team GS Caltex.

2009
The Dominican Republic Guild of Sport Writers make her recipient of the 2008 Volleyball Athlete of the Year. In June 2009, at the 2010 World Championship NORCECA Qualification Pool H, at Santiago de los Caballeros, Dominican Republic, she won the Best Spiker award. A month later, she carry her National Team to the silver medal at the 2009 Pan-American Cup, and she was elected Most Valuable Player of the event.

After winning with her team the 2009 NORCECA Championship, she took a sabbatical year due to maternity.

2010
Returning from the sabbatical year, De La Cruz joined her National Senior Team winning the 2010 Final Four Cup gold medal.

De la Cruz played with the local team Navarrete from Santiago, Dominican Republic, taking the team to the final series. During the final series, Bethania left the team to participate with Mirador at the World Club Championship, taking the fourth place. Later Navarrete would take the Santiago Intermunicipal Championship.

2011
Bethania joined the Canadian Stacey Gordon and countrymate Brenda Castillo at the Puerto Rican team Criollas de Caguas to play the 2011 Puerto Rican League season, leading the team to win the regular season with a 20-2 record. De la Cruz set a new record in serving, with 57 aces, topped the scorers with 392 points and won the Most Valuable Player award. Despite of all these awards, Bethania said she wasn't in plenty physically shape.

During the quarterfinals, she set another record with 9 aces in a playoff match. Bethania crowned the season winning the Puerto Rico League Championship, sweeping the final series against the Mets de Guaynabo.

De La Cruz win the MVP award and the silver medal at the 2011 NORCECA Championship. One month later, Bethania participated with her home team at the 2011 Pan American Games held in Guadalajara, Mexico. She won the Best Scorer award and her team finished in 4th place.

The Japanese club Denso Airybees, announced her joining in November 2011.

Bethania win the Best Scorer and Best Server awards at the 2011 World Cup played in November in Japan. As the key player for her team, she was four times the Top Scorer by day and had three of the five best performances during the competition, including 42 points Vs. Germany on November 12. Her national team finished in the 8th place.

2012-2015
For her performances during 2011, De la Cruz was named Volleyball Player of the Year and nominated for the top national award of Athlete of the Year, later won by taekwondo practitioner and Olympic medalist Gabriel Mercedes and was awarded by the Dominican Republic Guild of Sport Writers among the 2011 Vollyeball Athlete of the Year.

De la Cruz joined the Turkish club Eczacıbaşı VitrA and help them win the 2014–15 CEV Champions League by defeating 3-0 to the Italian Yamamay Busto Arsizio. She was named one of the Best Outside Spikers from the competition. This championship qualified her club to the 2015 FIVB Club World Championship that her team won after beating the Russian Dinamo Krasnodar.

2016-
She joined the ongoing 2019 Indonesian Proliga club Jakarta Pertamina Energi starting in the second round, 
 and helping her club to reach the league's second place and winning the Best Server individual award. De la Cruz joined Mirador for the 2019 season of the Dominican Republic Superior Volleyball League from the National District winning the League Championship and being awarded Most Valuable Player and Best Spiker.

She then headed to Russia, having signed with Dynamo Kazan. With this club she won the 2019 Russian Cup gold medal and the Best Server award. Because of the COVID-19 pandemic in Russia the championship stopped and Dinamo Kazan was declared season's champion. She was offered an extension for the 2020/21 season, but she took so long to answer. she was awarded jointly with Brayelin Martinez 2019 Vollyeball Athlete of the Year by the Dominican Republic Guild of Sport Writers.

De la Cruz finished in the second place during the 2021 season of the players centered, American league Athletes Unlimited Volleyball, after recording 3,690 points, just behind Olympic American player Jordan Larson, who recorded 4,569. She was named 2021 Volleyball Player of the Year and nominated for the Athlete of the Year award, the latter finally won by water skier Robert Pigozzi. For the 2021 Club World Championship, she joined the Kazakh club Altay Volleyball Club.

Clubs
  Deportivo Nacional (2001–2004)
  Mirador (2004–2006)
  Vaqueras de Bayamón (2007)
  Toray Arrows (2007–2008)
  GS Caltex (2008–2009)
  Navarrete (2010)
  Mirador (2010)
  Criollas de Caguas (2011)
  Denso Airybees (2011–2012)
  GS Caltex (2012–2014)
  Eczacıbaşı VitrA (2014–2015)
  Dinamo Moscow (2016–2017)
  Savino Del Bene Scandicci (2017-2018)
  Jakarta Pertamina Energi (2019)
  Mirador (2019)
  Dynamo Kazan (2019–2020)
  Athletes Unlimited Volleyball (2021-2022)
  Altay Volleyball Club (2021/22)

Awards

Individuals
 2006 Dominican Republic Torneo Superior del Distrito Nacional "Regular Series Most Valuable Player" 2006 Dominican Republic Torneo Superior del Distrito Nacional "Final Series Most Valuable Player"'''
 2006 Dominican Republic Torneo Superior del Distrito Nacional "Best Spiker"
 2006 NORCECA Women's Junior Continental Championship U-20 "Most Valuable Player" 2006 NORCECA Women's Junior Continental Championship U-20 "Best Scorer" 2006 TV Azteca's Women Stars Volleyball Cup "Most Valuable Player" 2007 Puerto Rican League "Best Attacker" 2007 Puerto Rican League All-Star 2007 Puerto Rican League All-Star Game "Most Valuable Player" 2007 NORCECA Championship "Best Scorer" 2007 Pan-American Cup "Best Scorer" 2007 Pan-American Games "Best Scorer" 2007 Dominican Republic "Volleyball Player of the Year" 2007-08 Women's V.Premier League Best 6 2008 Final Four Cup "Best Scorer" 2008 Final Four Cup "Best Attacker" 2008 Salonpas Cup "Best Attacker" 2008 Dominican Republic "Volleyball Player of the Year" 2008–2009 NH Bank Cup Korean V-League "All-Star" 2008–2009 NH Bank Cup Korean V-League "Best Player of 1st. Round" 2008–2009 NH Bank Cup Korean V-League "Best Attacker" 2010 World Championship NORCECA Qualification Pool H "Best Spiker" 2009 Pan-American Cup "Most Valuable Player" 2009 Pan-American Cup "Best Server" 2011 Puerto Rican League "Most Valuable Player" 2011 Puerto Rican League "Best Scorer" 2011 Puerto Rican League "Best Server" 2011 NORCECA Championship "Most Valuable Player" 2011 Dominican Republic "Volleyball Player of the Year" 2011 Pan American Games "Best Scorer" 2011 World Cup "Best Scorer" 2011 World Cup "Best Server" 2012 Summer Olympics NORCECA qualification tournament's MVP 2011–2012 Japanese League – "Best Scorer" 2011–2012 Japanese League – "Best Server" 2011–2012 Japanese League – "Best 6" 2013 NORCECA Championship "Best Outside Hitter" 2014 Pan-American Cup "Best Outside Spiker" 2014–15 CEV Women's Champions League "Best Outside Spiker" 2017 Pan-American Cup "Best Outside Spiker" 2019 Indonesian Proliga – "Best Server" 2019 Dominican Republic Superior Volleyball League – "Most Valuable Player" 2019 Dominican Republic Superior Volleyball League – "Best Spiker" 2019 Pan American Games "Best Outside Hitter" 2019 Pan American Games "Most Valuable Player" 2019 NORCECA Championship "Best Server" 2019 Russian Cup – "Best Server" 2021 NORCECA Championship "Best Outside Spiker" 2021 Dominican Republic "Volleyball Player of the Year" 2022 Athletes Unlimited "Individual Champion" 2022 Athletes Unlimited "Best Outside Hitter"''

Beach Volleyball
 2006 National Championship —  Bronze Medal

National Team

Senior Team
 2006 TV Azteca's Women Stars Volleyball Cup —  Gold Medal

Junior Team
 2006 NORCECA Women's Junior Continental Championship U-20 —  Silver Medal

Clubs
 2006 Dominican Republic Torneo Superior del Distrito Nacional —  Champion, with Mirador
 2007 Japan Empress's Cup —  Champion, with Toray Arrows
 2007-08 Japan V.Premier League —  Champion, with Toray Arrows
 2011 Puerto Rican League —  Champion, with Criollas de Caguas
 2011-12 Japan V.Premier League —  Bronze medal, with Denso Airybees
 2012–13 Korean League –  Runner-Up, with GS Caltex
 2012–13 Korean Cup —  Champion, with GS Caltex
 2013–14 Korean League —  Champion, with GS Caltex
 2014–15 CEV Champions League —  Champion, with Eczacıbaşı VitrA
 2014–15 Turkish Women's Volleyball League –  Bronze medal, with Eczacıbaşı VitrA
 2015 FIVB Club World Championship –  Champion, with Eczacıbaşı VitrA
 2016 Russian Cup — Runner-Up, with Dinamo Moscow
 2016–17 Russian Championship –  Champion, with Dinamo Moscow
 2019 Indonesian Proliga — Runner-Up, with Jakarta Pertamina Energi
 2019 Dominican Republic Superior Volleyball League —  Champion, with Mirador
 2019 Russian Cup —  Champion, with Dynamo Kazan
 2019–20 Russian Championship –  Champion, with Dynamo Kazan

References

External links
 FIVB biography
 Korean League Profile

1989 births
Living people
Sportspeople from Santo Domingo
Dominican Republic women's volleyball players
Volleyball players at the 2012 Summer Olympics
Volleyball players at the 2020 Summer Olympics
Olympic volleyball players of the Dominican Republic
Volleyball players at the 2007 Pan American Games
Volleyball players at the 2011 Pan American Games
Volleyball players at the 2015 Pan American Games
Volleyball players at the 2019 Pan American Games
Pan American Games medalists in volleyball
Pan American Games bronze medalists for the Dominican Republic
Medalists at the 2015 Pan American Games
Medalists at the 2019 Pan American Games
Central American and Caribbean Games medalists in volleyball
Central American and Caribbean Games gold medalists for the Dominican Republic
Competitors at the 2006 Central American and Caribbean Games
Competitors at the 2014 Central American and Caribbean Games
Opposite hitters
Eczacıbaşı volleyball players
Expatriate volleyball players in the United States
Expatriate volleyball players in Japan
Expatriate volleyball players in South Korea
Expatriate volleyball players in Russia
Expatriate volleyball players in Turkey
Expatriate volleyball players in Italy
Dominican Republic expatriate sportspeople in Japan
Dominican Republic expatriate sportspeople in South Korea
Dominican Republic expatriate sportspeople in the United States
Dominican Republic expatriate sportspeople in Italy